These are the official results of the Men's Discus Throw event at the 1983 World Championships in Helsinki, Finland. There were a total of 26 participating athletes, with the final held on Sunday August 14, 1983. The qualification mark was set at 63.00 metres.

Medalists

Schedule
All times are Eastern European Time (UTC+2)

Abbreviations
All results shown are in metres

Records

Qualification

Final

See also
 1980 Men's Olympic Discus Throw (Moscow)
 1982 Men's European Championships Discus Throw (Athens)
 1984 Men's Olympic Discus Throw (Los Angeles)
 1986 Men's European Championships Discus Throw (Stuttgart)

References
 Results
 World Athletics

D
Discus throw at the World Athletics Championships